It's Mr. Pants is a puzzle video game developed by Rare. It was published by THQ for the Game Boy Advance (GBA) handheld game console in North America and Europe in 2004–2005. A port of the game for mobile phones was developed and published internationally by In-Fusio in 2005–2006. The game stars Mr. Pants, a crudely drawn mascot formerly featured on Rare's website who had made cameo appearances in several prior Rare games.

Gameplay 
The basic idea of the game is to create rectangles which have to be two-by-three blocks or larger to clear them from the grid. Blocks cannot be placed on top of blocks of the same color that are already on the grid, but they can be placed on top of blocks of any other color which causes the different blocks on the grid to disappear.

The game incorporates three main game modes: Puzzle, in which players must clear a puzzle board using a limited selection of specific blocks; Wipeout, in which players have a two minute time limit to clear all blocks from the grid; and Marathon, in which the available grid space is slowly restricted while players attempt to achieve the highest score possible. Each mode has four difficulty levels, ranging from "Easy" to "Special", with each difficulty unlocked after clearing the previous one. Players are awarded a trophy for each successfully completed difficulty level. Upon completing all four difficulties in Puzzle mode, a fourth game type is unlocked called "Max the Mystical Mouse's Muddle", in which players must clear rectangles of specific sizes as provided by the eponymous Max.

Development and release

It's Mr. Pants was developed by Rare, which, during much of the game's production, was a second-party developer for Nintendo. Rare was responsible for creating games in Nintendo's long-running Donkey Kong franchise. Early in the course of development, the game went through several name changes including Splonge, Nutcracker, Animal Cracker, and Sunflower. It was eventually presented by Rare at the Electronic Entertainment Expo 2001 as Donkey Kong Coconut Crackers, one of four titles for Nintendo's GBA handheld game console. In September 2002, Nintendo announced it had sold off its 49 percent stake in Rare back to the latter company; Rare subsequently sold its entire company to Microsoft Studios. The Donkey Kong intellectual property for which Nintendo held Rare responsible, defaulted back to Nintendo, forcing Rare to abandon this theme for the then-upcoming puzzle game. On August 11, 2003, Microsoft announced their partnership with publisher THQ for distributing Rare's GBA titles, including the newly revealed It's Mr. Pants, set for an early 2004 release.

It's Mr. Pants was originally conceived by Rare veterans Tim Stamper and Gregg Mayles. The game was chiefly designed by Justin Cook and Paul Machacek. Cook, who credits himself for creating two-thirds of the game's levels, described It's Mr. Pants as "just a solid puzzle game", stating, "We knew that it wasn't a big 'wow' game, but the playability was there." After the breakdown of its relationship with Nintendo, Rare chose to rebrand the game using one of their other characters. The team initially considered using characters from the Banjo-Kazooie or Sabreman franchises before settling on Rare's online mascot Mr. Pants, which the company used in its website surveys collectively called "The Pantsboard". The character Mr. Pants was originally illustrated by artist Leigh Loveday, but the design was implemented into the game by Ryan Stevenson. Mayles recounted that the "childish" visual style used in It's Mr. Pants was accomplished by having the right-handed artists draw with their left hands to intentionally make the illustrations appear "genuinely bad".

The Donkey Kong Coconut Crackers incarnation of the game featured the ability to switch between top-down 2D graphics and a 3D isometric layout. According to the developer, the isometric perspective was scrapped due to "consistency issues" when swapping between the two views, due to it being awkward seeing where puzzle pieces near the back of the board were, and finally because it "just didn't look as nice" as they had hoped. When It's Mr. Pants was first revealed as Donkey Kong Coconut Crackers, the game was intended to be multiplayer for up to four individuals using the GBA Game Link Cable. Rare had experimented with various multiplayer modes during the game's development, but ultimately released the game as single-player only. Once the game was submitted to THQ, the publisher requested a few slight changes be made. For instance, the "Crayon Snake" that circles around the board in Marathon Mode was originally called the "trouser snake". It's Mr. Pants was also in development for the Gizmondo handheld, but was cancelled due to the console's failure.

Reception

The original game received "mixed or average" reviews according to the review aggregation website Metacritic, receiving an average score of 73 out of 100.

References

External links

2004 video games
Cancelled Gizmondo games
Game Boy Advance games
Mobile games
Puzzle video games
THQ games
Rare (company) games
Video games scored by David Wise
Video games scored by Robin Beanland
Video games scored by Eveline Fischer Novakovic
Single-player video games
Video games developed in the United Kingdom
In-Fusio games